The nineteenth and final season of The Ellen DeGeneres Show (subtitled as Ellen: The Farewell Season) began airing on September 13, 2021 and concluded on May 26, 2022.

Episodes

References

External links

19
2021 American television seasons
2022 American television seasons